Guaranteed Kill is the first album from the New Hampshire group Scissorfight.

Track listing 
 "American Cloven Hoof Blues" - 2:35
 "Supervirgin vs. Death Machine" - 3:31
 "Helicopter Killing Cottonmouth" - 2:26
 "Fine Me" - 2:30
 "Chocorua Mountain Woman" - 3:22
 "Moosilaukie Rot" - 2:07
 "1893" - 3:28
 "Build More Prisons" - 2:52 
 "Mulekick" - 3:25
 "Tempest of Skulls" - 2:04 
 "Harvest of Horror" - 3:37
 "Joke" - 2:38
 "Planet of Ass" - 2:21
 "Mjolnir in the Valley of the Hags" - 2:30

Personnel
Ironlung – vocals
Jay Fortin – guitar
Kevin J. Strongbow – drums
Paul Jarvis – bass guitar

References

1996 debut albums
Scissorfight albums